A gasworks or gas house is an industrial plant for the production of flammable gas. Many of these have been made redundant in the developed world by the use of natural gas, though they are still used for storage space.

Early gasworks 

Coal gas was introduced to Great Britain in the 1790s as an illuminating gas by the Scottish inventor William Murdoch.

Early gasworks were usually located beside a river or canal so that coal could be brought in by barge. Transport was later shifted to railways and many gasworks had internal railway systems with their own locomotives.

Early gasworks were built for factories in the Industrial Revolution from about 1805 as a light source and for industrial processes requiring gas, and for lighting in country houses from about 1845. Country house gas works are extant at Culzean Castle in Scotland and Owlpen in Gloucestershire.

Equipment
A gasworks was divided into several sections for the production, purification and storage of gas.

Retort house

This contained the retorts in which coal was heated to generate the gas. The crude gas was siphoned off and passed on to the condenser. The waste product left in the retort was coke. In many cases the coke was then burned to heat the retorts or sold as smokeless fuel.

Condenser
This consisted of a bank of air-cooled gas pipes over a water-filled sump. Its purpose was to remove tar from the gas by condensing it out as the gas was cooled. Occasionally the condenser pipes were contained in a water tank similar to a boiler but operated in the same manner as the air-cooled variant. The tar produced was then held in a tar well/tank which was also used to store liquor.

Exhauster
An impeller or pump was used to increase the gas pressure before scrubbing. Exhausters were optional components and could be placed anywhere along the purifying process but were most often placed after the condensers and immediately before the gas entered the gas holders.

Scrubber
A sealed tank containing water through which the gas was bubbled. This removed ammonia and ammonium compounds. The water often contained dissolved lime to aid the removal of ammonia. The water left behind was known as ammonical liquor. Other versions used consisted of a tower, packed with coke, down which water was trickled.

Purifier
Also known as an Iron Sponge, this removed hydrogen sulfide from the gas by passing it over wooden trays containing moist ferric oxide. The gas then passed on to the gasholder and the iron sulfide was sold to extract the sulfur. Waste from this process often gave rise to blue billy, a ferrocyanide contaminant in the land which causes problems when trying to redevelop an old gasworks site.

Benzole plant
Often only used at large gasworks sites, a benzole plant consisted of a series of vertical tanks containing petroleum oil through which the gas was bubbled. The purpose of a benzole plant was to extract benzole from the gas. The benzole dissolved into the petroleum oil was run through a steam separating plant to be sold separately.

Gasholder
The gas holder or gasometer was a tank used for storage of the gas and to maintain even pressure in distribution pipes. The gas holder usually consisted of an upturned steel bell contained within a large frame that guided it as it rose and fell depending on the amount of gas it contained.

By-products
The by-products of gas-making, such as coke, coal tar, ammonia and sulfur had many uses. For details, see coal gas.

British gasworks today
Coal gas is no longer made in the UK but many gasworks sites are still used for storage and metering of natural gas and some of the old gasometers are still in use. Fakenham gasworks dating from 1846 is the only complete, non-operational gasworks remaining in England. Other examples exist at Biggar in Scotland and Carrickfergus in Northern Ireland.

Photos of Fakenham Gas Works

Gasworks in popular culture
Gasworks were noted for their foul smell and generally located in the poorest areas of metropolitan areas. Cultural remnants of gasworks include many streets named Gas Street or Gas Avenue and groups or gangs known as Gas House Gang, such as the 1934 St. Louis Cardinals baseball team. The 1946 film Gas House Kids features children from New York's Gas House District taking on a gang, and spawned two sequels. Ewan McColl's 1968 song "Dirty Old Town" (about his home town of Salford) famously begins "Found my love by the gaswork croft…" (in cover versions often "I met my love by the gasworks wall…")

Fans of Bristol Rovers F.C. in south west England are known as ‘Gas-Heads’ due to the proximity of gasometers near to their original ground at Eastville in Bristol. Bristol Rovers F.C. is also known as ‘The Gas’.

Railway gasworks 

Gas was used for many years to illuminate the interior of railway carriages. The New South Wales Government Railways manufactured its own oil-gas for this purpose, together with reticulated coal-gas to railway stations and associated infrastructure. Such works were established at the Macdonaldtown Carriage Sheds, Newcastle, Bathurst, Junee and Werris Creek. These plants followed on from the works of a private supplier which the railway took over in 1884.

Gas was also transported in special travelling gas reservoir wagons from the gasworks to stationary reservoirs located at a number of country stations where carriage reservoirs were replenished.

With the spreading conversion to electric power for lighting buildings and carriages during the 1920s and 1930s, the railway gasworks were progressively decommissioned.

Gasworks being operated as industrial museums

Gasworks Brisbane, Australia
The Gasworks Newstead site in Brisbane Australia has been a stalwart of the river’s edge since its development in 1863. By 1890, the works were supplying gas to Brisbane streets from Toowong to Hamilton and over the next 100 years, it would grow to supply Brisbane city with the latest in gas technology until it was decommissioned in 1996.

In March 1866, the Queensland Defence Force placed an official request for town gas connection, evidence of the vital role the gasworks played in the economic development of colonial Brisbane. In fact, the gasworks were considered to be of such importance, that during World War II, genuine fears of attack from Japanese air raids motivated the installation of anti aircraft guns which vigilantly watched over the plant and its employees throughout the war.

The site itself has been synonymous with economic growth and benefit to Brisbane and Queensland with the success of the gasworks facilitating further development of the Newstead/Teneriffe area to include the James Hardie fibro-cement manufacturing plant, Shell Oil plant, Brisbane Water and Sewerage Depot and even the “Brisbane Gas Company Cookery School” which operated in the 1940s. In 1954, a carbonizing plant was built, giving Brisbane the "most modern gas producing plant in Australia", consuming 100 tonnes of coal every eight hours.

During its golden years in the late 19th and early 20th centuries, the site also played a vital role in providing employment to aboriginal Australians and many migrant workers arriving there from Europe after the second World War.

The fine tradition of the Brisbane Gasworks economic and employment-based successes will not be lost or forgotten with the Teneriffe Gasworks Village Development paying homage to the sites history and integrity in its pending urban development.

The gasholder structure at this site is set to become a hub of a new property development on the site – keeping the structural integrity of the pig iron structure. It will be a true reflection of urban renewal embracing its industrial past.

Dunedin Gasworks Museum
Located in South Dunedin, New Zealand, the Dunedin Gasworks Museum consists of a conserved engine house featuring a working boiler house, fitting shop and collection of five stationary steam engines. There are also displays of domestic and industrial gas appliances.

Technopolis (Gazi)
Located in Athens, Greece Technopolis (Gazi) is a gasworks converted to an exhibition space.

The Gas Museum, Leicester
The Gas Museum in Leicester, UK is operated by The National Gas Museum Trust.

Gas Works Park
Gas Works Park is a public park in Seattle, Washington.

Warsaw Gasworks Museum
The Warsaw Gasworks Museum is a museum in Warsaw, Poland.

Museo dell'Acqua e del Gas
The Museo dell'Acqua e del Gas is a museum in Genoa, Italy. 
It is located in the industrial area of the IREN company, an Italian multi-utility, where coal gas has been produced till 1972.
The small Museum, managed by Fondazione AMGA, hosts a rich collection of industrial finds, related to water and gas works history.

Hasdanpaşa Gasworks 

See also
 History of manufactured fuel gases
British Gas plc

References 

Chemical plants
Fuel gas
Industrial buildings